Rotruda (or Roza) of Pavia (died after March 945) was an Italian noblewoman. Rotruda was married to Giselbert I of Bergamo and later became the mistress of Hugh of Italy.

Life
Rotruda was the daughter of the iudex (judge) Walpert of Pavia. She married Giselbert of Bergamo c.895. Together they had a son, Lanfranc I of Bergamo.

Probably after Giselbert I’s death (c.927/929), Rotruda became the mistress of Hugh of Italy, with whom she had a daughter, Rotlinda. Because of her relationship with Hugh, Rotruda is mentioned in Liutprand of Cremona's work Antapodosis.

Marriage and children
With Giselbert, Rotruda had the following children:
Lanfranc I of Bergamo

With Hugh, Rotruda had the following children:
Rotlinda (or Rolenda) (930-1001), who married Bernard, count of Pavia

References
Liutprand of Cremona, Antapodosis, in Die Werke Liudprands von Cremona, ed. J. Becker, MGH SS rer Germ 41 (Hannover and Leipzig, 1915), accessible online at: Monumenta Germaniae Historica (in Latin)
Liutprand of Cremona, The Complete Works of Liudprand of Cremona, ed. and trans. P. Squatriti (Washington, D.C., 2007). (English translation)
F. Menant, ‘Les Giselbertins, comtes du comté de Bergame et comtes palatins,’ in Formazione e strutture dei ceti dominanti nel medioevo (1988), pp. 115–186.
J. Jarnut, Bergamo 568-1098. Verfassungs-, Sozial- und Wirtschaftsgeschichte einer lombardischen Stadt im Mittelalter (Wiesbaden, 1977). 
D.A. Bullough, ‘Urban change in Early Medieval Italy: the example of Pavia,’ Papers of the British School at Rome 34, n.s. 21 (1966), 82-130.

External links
Rotruda (Roza), Gräfin von Bergamo

Notes

People from Pavia
10th-century Italian nobility
Italian countesses
Mistresses of Italian royalty